The Hajvalia mine is one of the largest lead and zinc mines in Kosovo. The mine is located in Leposavić. The mine has reserves amounting to 0.723 million tonnes of ore grading 9.65% lead, 18.26% zinc, and 126.4gr/t silver, thus resulting  tonnes of lead,  tonnes of zinc and 91 tonnes of silver.

References

External links
Official website

Lead and zinc mines in Kosovo
Mitrovica, Kosovo